Vision Divine is the first studio album by the Italian progressive power metal band Vision Divine released in 1999.

Track listing
All music written by Fabio Lione (Tordiglione) and Olaf Thörsen (Magnani) except where noted.

Credits
 Fabio Lione - Vocals
 Olaf Thörsen – Guitars
 Andrea Torricini – Bass
 Andrea DePaoli – Keyboards
 Mat Stancioiu – Drums

References

1999 debut albums
Vision Divine albums